The Carnegie Hall Jazz Band was a big band organized in 1991 by George Wein. Its musical director was Jon Faddis.

The group gave its first performance in October 1992, and gave concerts paying tribute to classic jazz musicians as well as new commissions or arrangements from living composers, including Muhal Richard Abrams, Toshiko Akiyoshi, Garnett Brown, John Clayton, Slide Hampton, Jimmy Heath, Dick Hyman, Jim McNeely, Randy Sandke, Maria Schneider, and Dennis Wilson. The band did worldwide tours in the period 1994-1996 and recorded several albums. It was active until 2002, when the new director of Carnegie Hall eliminated support for it in the 2002–2003 season.

Discography
The Carnegie Hall Salutes the Jazz Masters (Verve, 1994)
The Carnegie Hall Jazz Band (Blue Note, 1996)
Eastwood After Hours – Live At Carnegie Hall (Malpaso/Warner Bros. Records, 1997)

References
"Carnegie Hall Jazz Band". The New Grove Dictionary of Jazz. 2nd edition, ed. Barry Kernfeld, 2004.
"New Director At Carnegie Eliminates Its Jazz Band", The New York Times, Jan. 17, 2002

American jazz ensembles from New York City
Musical groups from New York City
Jazz musicians from New York (state)
Carnegie Hall